The 2009 BWF World Championships was the 17th tournament of the World Badminton Championships. It was held at the Gachibowli Indoor Stadium in Hyderabad, Andhra Pradesh, India, from 10 to 16 August, 2009. Following the results of the women's doubles.

Seeds

 Chin Eei Hui / Wong Pei Tty (third round)
 Cheng Shu / Zhao Yunlei (final)
 Lee Hyo-jung / Lee Kyung-won (quarter-final)
 Ha Jung-eun / Kim Min-jung (quarter-final)
 Du Jing / Yu Yang (semi-final)
 Ma Jin / Wang Xiaoli (semi-final)
 Cheng Wen-hsing / Chien Yu-chin (quarter-final)
 Zhang Yawen / Zhao Tingting (champion)
 Lena Frier Kristiansen / Kamilla Rytter Juhl (third round)
 Shendy Puspa Irawati / Meiliana Jauhari (third round)
 Miyuki Maeda / Satoko Suetsuna (quarter-final)
 Helle Nielsen / Marie Røpke (third round)
 Greysia Polii / Nitya Krishinda Maheswari (third round)
 Valeria Sorokina / Nina Vislova (withdrew)
 Shinta Mulia Sari / Yao Lei (third round)
 Mizuki Fujii / Reika Kakiiwa (third round)

Main stage

Section 1

Section 2

Section 3

Section 4

Final stage

External links 
Results

Women's doubles
BWF